The 1986 Prix de l'Arc de Triomphe was a horse race held at Longchamp on Sunday 5 October 1986. It was the 65th running of the Prix de l'Arc de Triomphe.

The winner was Dancing Brave, a three-year-old colt trained in Great Britain by Guy Harwood. The winning jockey was Pat Eddery.

The winning time of 2m 27.7s set a new record for the race. The previous record of 2m 28.0s was achieved by Detroit in 1980.

The field is considered to be one of the strongest in the race's history. Major races won by the runners in 1986 included;

Dancing Brave – 2,000 Guineas Stakes, Eclipse Stakes, King George VI and Queen Elizabeth Stakes
Bering – Prix du Jockey Club
Triptych – Champion Stakes
Shahrastani – Epsom Derby, Irish Derby
Shardari – International Stakes
Darara – Prix Vermeille
Acatenango – Aral-Pokal, Grand Prix de Saint-Cloud, Grosser Preis von Berlin
Saint Estephe – Coronation Cup

The strength of the field and Dancing Brave's performance led to the race coming first in a Racing Post readers' vote in 2022 to decide the "Greatest ever horse race".

Race details
 Sponsor: Trusthouse Forte
 Purse: 6,800,000 F; First prize: 4,000,000 F
 Going: Firm
 Distance: 2,400 metres
 Number of runners: 15
 Winner's time: 2m 27.7s (new record)

Full result

 Abbreviations: shd = short-head; nk = neck

Winner's details
Further details of the winner, Dancing Brave.
 Sex: Colt
 Foaled: 11 May 1983
 Country: United States
 Sire: Lyphard; Dam: Navajo Princess (Drone)
 Owner: Khalid Abdullah
 Breeder: Glen Oak Farm

References

Prix de l'Arc de Triomphe
 1986
Prix de l'Arc de Triomphe
Prix de l'Arc de Triomphe
Prix de l'Arc de Triomphe